The Bavaria Party (BP) is an autonomist, regionalist and conservative political party in the state of Bavaria, Germany. The party was founded in 1946, describes itself as patriotic Bavarian and advocates Bavarian independence within the European Union. Together with the Christian Social Union (CSU), it can be seen as an heir to the Bavarian People's Party (BVP) which existed prior to the Nazi takeover. The party is a member of the European Free Alliance.

History 
The party had some successes at the polls in the late 1940s and 1950s: 20.9% of the votes in Bavaria in 1949 and 17 seats in the German Bundestag and, in 1950, 17.9% and 39 seats in the Bavarian state parliament where in 1954 it formed a coalition with the Bavarian branches of the Social Democratic Party of Germany (SPD) and the Free Democratic Party (FDP). This forced the Christian Social Union (CSU) out of power for three years. 

Later, mainly caused by the casino affair, which was influenced by the CSU and its general secretary Friedrich Zimmermann, the Bavaria Party rapidly lost voters. It still exists but was last elected to the Bavarian state parliament in 1962.

In the 2008 local elections however, the party won 50 seats (compared to 32 in 2002), mostly in Upper Bavaria, including one of the 80 seats in the City Council of Munich, the capital of Bavaria, after 42 years of absence there. The Bavaria Party won one seat in the District Parliament of Upper Bavaria.

Chairman 

The current chairman of the party is Florian Weber from Bad Aibling in Upper Bavaria.

Elections 
In the 2018 elections for the Bavarian Parliament the BP reached 1.7% of the voters' share. In  2013 they had gained 2.1%, the best result for the Bavaria Party since 1966.

After the elections of 2018, the Bavaria Party is represented in three administrative regions of Bavaria:

Upper Bavaria: 2 seats (2013: 3)
Lower Bavaria: 1 seat (2013: 1)
Swabia (Bavaria): 1 seat (2013: 1)

Election results

Results from 1946

Landtag of Bavaria

See also 
List of political parties in Germany

References

External links 
 

Conservative parties in Germany
Politics of Bavaria
Catholic political parties
1946 establishments in Germany
Political parties established in 1946
Separatism in Germany
Secessionist organizations in Europe
Regional parties in Germany
Eurosceptic parties in Germany
European Free Alliance
Bavarian nationalism